Santa Ynez (Spanish for Saint Agnes) can refer to:

Places
 Santa Ynez, California, a census-designated place located in Santa Barbara County, California
 Santa Ynez Mountains, mountains south of Santa Ynez Valley
 Santa Ynez Valley AVA, California wine region in Santa Barbara County
 Santa Ynez Valley, a group of six communities located in Santa Barbara County, California

People
Santa Ynez Band of Chumash Mission Indians, a tribe of Chumash people located in Santa Barbara County

Other
Santa Ynez Apartments, off-campus apartments that belong to the University of California, Santa Barbara (UCSB) in the city of Goleta, California
Santa Ynez Valley Union High School, a California Distinguished School located in Santa Ynez, California
Mission Santa Inés, the 19th mission in the California mission chain located in Solvang, California
 USNS Mission Santa Ynez (AO-134), a United States Navy fleet oiler built during World War II